Herberto de Azevedo Sales (September 21, 1917 in Andaraí, state of Bahia, Brazil – August 13, 1999 in Rio de Janeiro) was a Brazilian journalist and writer.

He was a member of Academia Brasileira de Letras.

Biography

First years 
Son of Heráclito Sousa Sales and Aurora de Azevedo.

He studied elementary school in Andaraí, a former mining town of Chapada Diamantina. He went to Salvador to attend the gym at the Antônio Vieira College, jesuits, where his talent was observed by the teachers, among whom Father Cabral, who had also encouraged the talents of Anísio Teixeira and Flávio Neves, in Caetité (hometown of both and where the Jesuit had directed the college "São Luís Gonzaga"), and later Jorge Amado.

Adulthood 
Despite the favorable environment, Herberto dropped out of school in the fifth year, returning to his hometown, where he lived until 1948, working as a notary officer. He also worked as a prospector and merchant, activities that gave him the basis and knowledge for his first work.

There he wrote and published, in 1944, his debut novel, Gravel, based on the lives of diamond miners and considered a classic of literary regionalism. But the reception of the book in Andaraí, the writer's homeland, was not the best. He began to suffer death threats from the local commandos, the "corons", who felt represented in an unflattering way in the novel.  On the other hand, the publication of the book had put Sales on the national intellectual scene. Thus, he decides to move to Rio de Janeiro, then the capital of the Republic, where he began working as a journalist in various press agencies, especially the magazine O Cruzeiro, which, for decades, was the most important periodical in Brazil.

In 1974 he moved to Brasília, where he was director of the National Book Institute. In the government José Sarney is appointed advisor to the Presidency of the Republic, until when, in 1986, he went to Paris, as a cultural attaché of the Embassy of Brazil. When he returns to the country, he seeks isolation in the small town of São Pedro da Aldeia.

Marriage 
He was married to Maria Juraci Xavier Chamusca Sales, with whom he had three children.

Works 

 Cascalho, romance (1944)
 Os Belos Contos da Eterna Infância, anthology (1948)
 Baixo Relêvo, crônica (1954)
 Além dos Marimbus, romance (1961)
 Dados Biográficos do Finado Marcelino, romance (1965)
 Histórias Ordinárias, short stories (1966)
 O Sobradinho dos Pardais, juvenile literature (1969)
 O Lobisomem e outros contos folclóricos, short stories (1970)
 Uma Telha de Menos, short stories (1970)
 O Japão: experiências e observações de uma viagem, travel notes (1971)
 A Feiticeira da Salina, juvenile literature (1974)
 A Vaquinha Sabida, juvenile literature (1974)
 O Homenzinho dos Patos, juvenile literature (1975)
 O Fruto do Vosso Ventre, romance (1976)
 O Casamento da Raposa com a Galinha, juvenile literature (1979)
 Armado Cavaleiro o Audaz Motoqueiro, short stories (1980)
 O Burrinho que Queria ser Gente, juvenile literature (1980)
 Os Pequenos Afluentes, short stories (1980)
 Einstein, o Minigênio, romance (1983)
 Os Pareceres do Tempo, romance (1984)
 O Menino Perdido, infanto-juvenil (1984)
 A Volta dos Pardais do Sobradinho, juvenile literature (1985)
 A Porta de Chifre, romance (1986)
 Subsidiário, memories (1988)
 Na Relva da tua Lembrança, memories (1988)
 Andanças por umas Lembranças (Subsidiário 2), memories (1990)
 O Urso Caçador, juvenile literature (1991)
 Eu de mim com cada um de mim (Subsidiário 3), memories (1992)
 Rio dos Morcegos, romance (1993)
 As Boas Más Companhias, romance (1995)
 Rebanho do Ódio, romance (1995)
 A Prostituta, romance (1996)
 História natural de Jesus de Nazaré: uma narrativa cristã, romance (1997)

Academias de Letras

Academia Brasileira de Letras 
On April 6, 1971, he was chosen to occupy the Chair no. 3 of the Academia Brasileira de Letras.

Academia Brasiliense de Letras 
He was also a member of Academia Brasiliense de Letras, from the Federal District.

References 

Brazilian writers
1917 births
1999 deaths